The Men's individual normal hill competition at the FIS Nordic World Ski Championships 2023 was held on 24 and 25 February 2023.

Qualification
The qualification was held on 24 February 2023.

Final
The first round was held on 25 February 2023 at 17:00 and the final round at 18:22.

References

Men's individual normal hill